Berlinsky is a surname. Notable people with the surname include:

Dmitri Berlinsky, Russian violinist and teacher
Valentin Berlinsky (1925–2008), Russian cellist

See also
 
 Berlinski